= Clackmannan County =

Clackmannan County might refer to:

- Clackmannan County F.C., an 1879 association football club in Alloa, Scotland; nowadays known as Alloa Athletic F.C.
- Clackmannanshire, Scotland; sometimes known as the County of Clackmannan
